Turkish-German rapper Ufo361 has released nine studio albums, three mixtapes and three extended plays.

Albums

Studio albums

Mixtapes

Extended plays

Singles

As lead artist

As featured artist

Other charted songs

Guest appearances

References

Discographies of German artists
Hip hop discographies